Don Alan Morrison (born December 16, 1949 in Fort Worth, Texas) is a former  American football offensive tackle in the National Football League for the New Orleans Saints, the Baltimore Colts, and the Detroit Lions. Morrison played college football at the University of Texas at Arlington.

External links
NFL.com player page

1949 births
Living people
Players of American football from Fort Worth, Texas
American football offensive tackles
Texas–Arlington Mavericks football players
New Orleans Saints players
Baltimore Colts players
Detroit Lions players